Bittium is a genus of very small sea snails, marine gastropod molluscs in the family Cerithiidae, the horn snails.

Distribution
This genus is found worldwide.

Description

Species 
Species in the genus Bittium include:

 Bittium aedonium (Watson, 1880)
 Bittium afrum 
 Bittium alabastrulum (Mörch, 1876) (nomen dubium)
 Bittium amboynense (Watson, 1881)
 Bittium anembatum (Melvill, 1904)
 Bittium aquaticum
 Bittium arenaense Hertlein & Strong, 1951
 Bittium armillatum (Carpenter, 1864)
 Bittium arnoldi Bartsch, 1911
 Bittium atramentarium Melvill & Standen, 1901
 Bittium bandatum Bozzetti, 2019 
 Bittium bartolomense Bartsch, 1917
 Bittium batillarium Kuroda & Habe, 1971
 Bittium caraboboense (Weisbord, 1962) (nomen dubium)
 Bittium casmaliense Bartsch, 1911
 Bittium cerithium 
 Bittium cerralvoense Bartsch, 1911
 Bittium challisae Bartsch, 1917
 Bittium chrysomallum Melvill, 1901
 Bittium circa Moreno, 2006
 Bittium clathratalum
 † Bittium courtillerianum (Millet, 1865) 
 † Bittium crassicostatum (Etheridge & Bell, 1898) 
 † Bittium crassum Landau, Ceulemans & Van Dingenen, 2018 
 Bittium decussatum (Carpenter, 1857)
 Bittium delicatum (Watson, 1880)
 Bittium depauperatum (Watson, 1880)
 Bittium diminutivum (Philippi, 1845)
 Bittium dumblei 
 Bittium editum (Powell, 1930)
 Bittium elegantissimum (Hedley, 1899)
 † Bittium eniwetokense Ladd, 1972 
 Bittium exiguum 
 Bittium fastigiatum Carpenter, 1864
 Bittium filosum 
 Bittium fretense 
 Bittium galactis Mörch, 1876 (nomen dubium)
 † Bittium gallicum Landau, Ceulemans & Van Dingenen, 2018 
 Bittium giganteum Bartsch, 1911
 Bittium glareosum Gould, 1861
 † Bittium gliberti Van Dingenen, Ceulemans & Landau, 2016 
 Bittium hartbergense 
 Bittium hawaiiensis 
 Bittium impendens (Hedley, 1899)
 Bittium incile Watson, 1897
 Bittium inornatum Bartsch, 1911 
 Bittium insulsum Preston, 1908
 Bittium koeneni 
 Bittium lacteum (Philippi, 1836)
 Bittium laevicordatum (Powell, 1937)
 † Bittium larrieyense Vignal, 1911 
 Bittium latreillii (Payraudeau, 1826)
 Bittium lima (Bruguière, 1792) (nomen dubium)
 † Bittium lozoueti Van Dingenen, Ceulemans & Landau, 2016 
 Bittium lusciniae (Watson, 1880)
 Bittium mexicanum Bartsch, 1911
 Bittium midwayense Kosuge, 1979
 Bittium multiliratum 
 Bittium nanum (Mayer, 1864) 
 Bittium nicholsi Bartsch, 1911
 Bittium nitens Carpenter, 1864
 Bittium ornatissimum Bartsch, 1911
 Bittium paleonotum 
 Bittium paludosum 
 Bittium panamense Bartsch, 1911
 Bittium peruvianum (d'Orbigny, 1841)
 Bittium philomelae (Watson, 1880)
 Bittium pigrum (Watson, 1880)
 † Bittium pingue Landau, Ceulemans & Van Dingenen, 2018 
 Bittium porcellanum Watson, 1886
 Bittium proteum (Jousseaume, 1930)
 Bittium pupiforme (Watson, 1880)
 Bittium quadricinctum  E. A. Smith, 1903
 † Bittium renauleauense Landau, Ceulemans & Van Dingenen, 2018 
 Bittium reticulatum (da Costa, 1778) – 
 Bittium rubanocinctum 
 Bittium russiensis 
 Bittium salinae  
 Bittium sanjuanense Bartsch, 1917
 Bittium santamariense Bartsch, 1917
 Bittium scalatum  
 Bittium semigranosum 
 Bittium semigranulosum''
 Bittium serra Bartsch, 1917
 Bittium simplex (Jeffreys, 1867)
 Bittium spina 
 Bittium stigmosum 
 Bittium submamillatum (Jeffreys, 1867)
 † Bittium sublima (d'Orbigny, 1852) 
 Bittium tenuispina 
 Bittium terebelloides 
 † Bittium transenna (Bayan, 1873) 
 Bittium tumidum Bartsch, 1907
 Bittium turritella 
 Bittium vancouverense Dall & Bartsch, 1910
 † Bittium venustulum (Millet, 1865) 
 † Bittium vignali Dollfus, 1909 
 Bittium watsoni (Jeffreys, 1885)
 Bittium xanthum Watson, 1886

Species brought into synonymy:
 Bittium adamsi Dall, 1889: synonym of Finella adamsi (Dall, 1889) 
 Bittium alternatum (Say, 1822) and Bittium nigrum (Totten, 1834) are synonyms of Bittiolum alternatum (Say, 1822)
 Bittium asperum Gabb, 1861: synonym of Lirobittium asperum (Gabb, 1861)
 Bittium attenuatum Carpenter, 1864 – slender cerith: synonym of Lirobittium attenuatum (Carpenter, 1864) 
 Bittium boeticum (Pease, 1860) and Bittium pusillum (Gould, 1851) are synonyms of Cerithium boeticum Pease, 1860
 Bittium catalinense Bartsch, 1907: synonym of Lirobittium purpureum (Carpenter, 1864)
 Bittium cinctum  Hutton, 1885: synonym of Seila cincta (Hutton, 1886)
 † Bittium cossmanni: synonym of † Hemicerithium cossmanni (Dall, 1892)  
 Bittium diplax Watson, 1886  is a synonym of Cerithidium diplax (Watson, 1886)
 Bittium eschrichti (Middendorff, 1849): synonym of Neostylidium eschrichtii (Middendorff, 1849)
 Bittium estuarinumTate, 1893: synonym of Zeacumantus plumbeus (G. B. Sowerby II, 1855)
 Bittium exile (Hutton, 1873): synonym of Zebittium exile (Hutton, 1873)
 Bittium fetellum Bartsch, 1911: synonym of Lirobittium fetellum (Bartsch, 1911) (original combination)
 Bittium furvum Watson, 1886 : synonym of  Cacozeliana furva (Watson, 1886)
 Bittium fuscocapitulum Hedley & Petterd, 1906 : synonym of  Cacozeliana fuscocapitulum (Hedley & Petterd, 1906)
 Bittium granarium (Kiener, 1842) is a synonym of Cacozeliana granarium (Kiener, 1842)
 Bittium hiloense: synonym of Bittinella hiloensis (Pilsbry & Vanatta, 1908)
 Bittium houbricki Ponder, 1993 : synonym of Ittibittium houbricki (Ponder, 1993)
 Bittium icarus (Bayle, 1880) : synonym of Cacozeliana icarus (Bayle, 1880)
 Bittium interfossa (Carpenter, 1864): synonym of Lirobittium interfossa (Carpenter, 1864)
 Bittium jadertinum Brusina, 1865: synonym of Bittium reticulatum (da Costa, 1778)
 Bittium johnstonae Bartsch, 1911: synonym of Lirobittium johnstonae (Bartsch, 1911) (original combination)
 Bittium larum Bartsch, 1911: synonym of Lirobittium larum (Bartsch, 1911) (original combination)
 Bittium lawleyanum Crosse, 1863: synonym of Zeacumantus plumbeus (G. B. Sowerby II, 1855)
 Bittium leucocephalum Watson, 1886 : synonym of Argyropeza leucocephala (Watson, 1886)
 Bittium minutulum: synonym of Batillariella minutula (Thiele, 1930) (original combination)
 Bittium munitum (Carpenter, 1864): synonym of Lirobittium munitum (Carpenter, 1864)
 Bittium oldroydae Bartsch, 1911: synonym of Lirobittium oldroydae (Bartsch, 1911) (original combination)
 Bittium oryza (Mörch, 1876) : synonym of Ittibittium oryza (Mörch, 1876)
 Bittium paganicum (Dall, 1919): synonym of Lirobittium paganicum (Dall, 1919)
 Bittium parcum Gould, 1861 is a synonym of Ittibittium parcum (Gould, 1861)
 Bittium perparvulum Watson, 1886 is a synonym of Cerithidium perparvulum (Watson, 1886)
 Bittium perpusillum Tryon, 1887 : synonym of Cerithium alutaceum (Gould, 1861)
 Bittium plumbeum: synonym of Zeacumantus plumbeus (G. B. Sowerby II, 1855)
 Bittium quadrifilatum Carpenter, 1864 – four-thread cerith: synonym of Lirobittium quadrifilatum (Carpenter, 1864) (original combination)
 Bittium scabrum (Olivi, 1792) : synonym of Bittium reticulatum (da Costa, 1778)
 Bittium seymourianum Strebel, 1908: synonym of Cerithiella seymouriana (Strebel, 1908) (original combination)
 Bittium subplanatum Bartsch, 1911: synonym of Lirobittium rugatum (Carpenter, 1864)
 Bittium torresiense Melvill & Standen, 1899 : synonym of Bittium elegantissimum (Hedley, 1899)
 Bittium variegatum Henn & Brazier, 1894 : synonym of Cacozeliana variegatum (Henn & Brazier, 1894)
 Bittium varium (Pfeiffer, 1840) – grass cerith is a synonym of Bittiolum varium (Pfeiffer, 1840)
 Bittium zebrum (Kiener, 1841) is a synonym of Cerithium zebrum Kiener, 1841

 See also 
 Cerithium IttibittiumReferences

 Biggs H.E. (1971). On a proposed new genus of cerithid mollusca from the Dahlak islands, Red Sea. Journal of Conchology 27: 221–223, pl. 7
 Gründel J. (1976). Zur Taxonomie und Phylogenie der Bittium-Gruppe. Malakologische Abhandlungen 5(3): 33–59
 Houbrick R. (1978). Redescription of Bittium proteum (Jousseaume, 1930) with comments on its generic placements. The Nautilus 92 (1): 9–11
 Vaught, K.C. (1989). A classification of the living Mollusca. American Malacologists: Melbourne, FL (USA). . XII, 195 pp
 Gofas, S.; Le Renard, J.; Bouchet, P. (2001). Mollusca, in: Costello, M.J. et al. (Ed.) (2001). European register of marine species: a check-list of the marine species in Europe and a bibliography of guides to their identification. Collection Patrimoines Naturels, 50: pp. 180–213

 Further reading 
 Gray, J. E. (1847). A list of the genera of recent Mollusca, their synonyma and types. Proceedings of the Zoological Society of London. 15: 129-219
 Powell A. W. B., New Zealand Mollusca'', William Collins Publishers Ltd, Auckland, New Zealand 1979 
 Gray, J.E. (1847). On the classification of the British Mollusca by W E Leach. Annals and Magazine of Natural History. ser. 1, 20: 267-273
 Verduin A. (1982). On the taxonomy and variability of recent european species of the genus Bittium Leach (Mollusca, Gastropoda, Prosobranchia). Basteria 46: 93-120
 Houbrick R. (1977). Reevaluation and new description of the genus Bittium (Cerithiidae). The Veliger 20 (2): 101-106

Cerithiidae